Dennis Theodore Avery was a Democratic member of the Indiana House of Representatives, representing the 75th District from 1974 until 2010.  He did not seek reelection in 2010.

References

External links
Indiana State Legislature - Representative Dennis T. Avery Official government website
Project Vote Smart - Representative Dennis T. Avery (IN) profile
Follow the Money - Dennis T. Avery
2006 2004 2002 2000 1998 1996 1994 campaign contributions

Democratic Party members of the Indiana House of Representatives
1946 births
Living people
Politicians from Evansville, Indiana
University of Evansville alumni
University of Southern Indiana people